Three-time defending champion Bill Tilden defeated Bill Johnston in the final, 6–4, 6–1, 6–4 to win the men's singles tennis title at the 1923 U.S. National Championships. It was Tilden's fourth U.S. Championships singles title and sixth major singles title overall.

Draw

Final eight

Earlier rounds

References

Men's singles
1923